Hanna Gabriels Valle (born 14 January 1983), known as Hanna Gabriels, is a Costa Rican professional boxer. She has held world championships in four weight classes, having held the WBA female light middleweight title since 2016; the WBA female light heavyweight and WBC female heavyweight titles since April 2021; the WBO welterweight title in 2009; and the WBO light middleweight title twice between 2010 and 2018. As of September 2020, she is ranked as the world's third best active light middleweight by The Ring and BoxRec.

Gabriels is the daughter of Yolanda Valle Moreno and Lesslie Gabriels Binns, a promising boxer who qualified for the Olympic Games in Moscow 1980, but was unable to attend. She has one brother, Windell, who played football in the Costa Rican Primera División.

Professional career 
Gabriels made her professional debut on 17 November 2007, against Nicaraguan Aoska Xochilet Herrera at the Gimnasio Nacional, San José, Costa Rica, winning by third-round technical knockout (TKO).

On 19 December 2009, Gabriels fought for the vacant WBO welterweight title against Argentine Gabriela Zapata at the Dennis Martínez National Stadium, Managua, Nicaragua, winning by TKO in the fourth round. The event and was part of an evening of posthumous tribute to three-weight Nicaraguan world champion Alexis Arguello, El Flaco Explosivo, considered one of the greatest boxers of all time.

On 14 January 2010, just over a month after capturing the WBO welterweight title, Gabriels relinquished the belt after suffering several blackouts - said to be caused by having to cut-weight in order to make the welterweight limit.

On 29 May 2010, Gabriels moved up in weight to face Dominican Gardy Álvarez for the vacant WBO junior middleweight title at the Coliseo Rubén Rodríguez, Bayamón, Puerto Rico, winning by first-round TKO in a fight that lasted only 11 seconds.

On 11 January 2011, Gabriels successfully defended her title against American Melisenda Pérez, winning by TKO in the tenth-round. Her cousin Andrés Calderón was present for the fight and was noted as part of her motivation to win in a following interview.

On 31 March 2011, Gabriels once again fought Melisenda Pérez, this time winning with a seventh-round TKO. With 14,000 in attendance, the event was part of the inauguration acts of the National Stadium of Costa Rica.

On 28 February 2013, Gabriels suffered her first career loss via second-round TKO to Oxandia Castillo of the Dominican Republic, losing her unbeaten streak and WBO junior middleweight title.

On 20 December 2014, after nearly two years out of the ring, Gabriels once again fought for the vacant WBO junior middleweight title against Mexican Paty Ramirez, regaining her title with a second-round TKO.

On 18 June 2016, Gabriels fought Katia Alvariño of Uruguay, winning by TKO in the third round, capturing the vacant WBA super welterweight title and becoming a unified world champion.

Gabriels defended the unified light middleweight championship twice in 2017; On 27 May, she won a unanimous decision over Canadian Natasha Spence, and on 13 October, avenged her first career loss against Oxandia Castillo by unanimous decision.

On 22 June 2018, Gabriels moved up in weight for the third time to challenge two-time Olympic gold medalist Claressa Shields for the vacant WBA and inaugural IBF middleweight titles at the Masonic Temple, Detroit. After becoming the first fighter to knock Shields down, Gabriels lost a 10 round unanimous decision (91-98, 92-97, 92-97).

Activism
In July 2019, Gabriels acknowledged in an interview that she suffered sexual abuse at age five as part of an effort to raise awareness about the issue. She is an activist for gender equity and against violence. That same year Gabriels was appointed by the United Nations High Commissioner for Refugees as a special collaborator to help campaigns for refugees and against xenophobia.

Professional boxing record

Notes

References

External links
 

1983 births
Living people
People from Alajuela
Costa Rican women boxers
Welterweight boxers
Light-middleweight boxers
World welterweight boxing champions
World light-middleweight boxing champions
World Boxing Organization champions
World Boxing Association champions
Costa Rican women's rights activists
Costa Rican women activists
United Nations High Commissioner for Refugees Goodwill Ambassadors